Martin Griffiths (born 3 July 1951) is a British diplomat who currently serves as Under-Secretary-General for Humanitarian Affairs and Emergency Relief Coordinator at the United Nations.

Personal life and education
Born in Wales, Griffiths was educated at Leighton Park School and holds a Master's degree in Southeast Asian Studies from the School of Oriental and African Studies at the University of London and is a qualified barrister. He speaks French and English.

Career

Griffiths is a career diplomat at the UK's Foreign, Commonwealth and Development Office and an experienced conflict mediator. Griffiths previously served as the first executive director of the European Institute of Peace from 2016 to September 2018. In 1999, he helped launch the Centre for Humanitarian Dialogue in Geneva. He has also worked for Save The Children, Action Aid and UNICEF and has worked as an advisor to multiple United Nations Syria envoys.

From 16 February 2018 to 19 July 2021 Griffiths served as the United Nations Special Envoy for Yemen at the Office of the Special Envoy of the Secretary-General for Yemen. In February 2021 he visited Iran in an attempt to find a political solution to the Yemeni Civil War.  Efforts to end the conflict were largely unsuccessful.

On 12 May 2021, United Nations Secretary-General António Guterres announced that he had appointed Griffiths as Under-Secretary-General for Humanitarian Affairs and Emergency Relief Coordinator at the Office for the Coordination of Humanitarian Affairs (OCHA), taking over from Mark Lowcock.

References

1951 births
Living people
Alumni of the University of London
Alumni of SOAS University of London
21st-century British diplomats
United Nations diplomats
British officials of the United Nations
Special Representatives of the Secretary-General of the United Nations
Yemen and the United Nations
Special Envoys of the Secretary-General of the United Nations
UN Special Envoys for Yemen